is a passenger railway station located in the Yurigaoka neighborhood of  Asao-ku, Kawasaki, Kanagawa, Japan and operated by the private railway operator Odakyu Electric Railway.

Lines
It lies 20.5 kilometers from the Shinjuku terminus.

Station layout
The station consists of two island platforms serving two tracks.

Platforms

History
Yurigaoka Station was opened on 25 March 1960. The station building was remodeled in 1981.

Station numbering was introduced in January 2014 with Yurigaoka being assigned station number OH22.

Passenger statistics
In fiscal 2019, the station was used by an average of 21,681 passengers daily.

The passenger figures for previous years are as shown below.

Surrounding area
Yurigaoka Daiichi housing complex (currently Sanrafure Yurigaoka)
 Yurigaoka No. 2 housing complex (currently Yurigaoka Mizuki-gai)

See also
 List of railway stations in Japan

References

External links

  

Railway stations in Kanagawa Prefecture
Railway stations in Japan opened in 1960
Odakyu Odawara Line
Railway stations in Kawasaki, Kanagawa